Abraham Quintanilla III (born December 13, 1963), known professionally as A.B. Quintanilla III or A.B. Quintanilla, is an American record producer, songwriter and musician, and the older brother of singer Selena, known as "The Queen of Tejano music".

Along with Selena, his other sister Suzette, and his father Abraham, he became a member of Los Dinos in 1980. As a member of Los Dinos, A.B. played bass guitar, produced, and wrote songs for Selena that became successful singles such as "Como la Flor", "Amor Prohibido" and "No Me Queda Más"  After Selena's death, he would create the bands Kumbia Kings and Kumbia All Starz.

Early life 
Abraham Isaac Quintanilla III was born on December 13, 1963 in Toppenish, Washington. He is the oldest child of Abraham Quintanilla Jr. and Marcella Ofelia Quintanilla (née Samora); and the older brother of Suzette Quintanilla and the late Selena Quintanilla. Shortly after he was born, Quintanilla and his parents would move to Lake Jackson, Texas, where he would be raised there and where his two younger sisters were born.

Career 
While living in Lake Jackson, Texas, A.B. learned to play the guitar and bass. Alongside Selena, his sister Suzette, and their father, Abraham, he became a member of the successful band Los Dinos. A.B. also became Selena's producer.

He co-wrote Selena's hit songs like "Como la Flor" ("Like the Flower") and "Amor Prohibido" ("Forbidden Love").

A.B.'s sister, Selena, was murdered on March 31, 1995, which greatly devastated him. He helped produce "Como Te Extraño" ("How I Miss You") by Pedro "Pete" Astudillo, which was written for Selena as well as Astudillo's late grandmother. The song earned Astudillo a Premios Lo Nuestro award for Best Song of the Year in 1996.

A.B. Quintanilla later resurfaced in 1999 by creating the Kumbia Kings, which mixed cumbia and pop music. The Kumbia Kings went on an international tour, had several CD releases and participated on such shows as Cristina Saralegui's El Show de Cristina. Quintanilla also produced for such entertainers as Thalía, Alicia Villarreal, Verónica Castro and Cristian Castro.

He produced and arranged the 2004 album, A.B. Quintanilla III Presents Joe Lopez, which includes "Cuando Estoy Contigo" ("When I Am with You") and "Soy Tan Feliz" ("I'm So Happy"), co-written by Quintanilla and Luigi Giraldo.

A.B. Quintanilla left Kumbia Kings in mid-2006. A.B., along with new members and ex-Kumbia Kings Chris Pérez (A.B.'s brother-in-law, Selena's widower) and Pee Wee; started the group Kumbia All Starz in 2006. This new group had hits such as "Chiquilla", "Parece Que Va a Llover", and "Speedy Gonzales". The Kumbia All Starz have become immensely popular in South America, especially in Bolivia, where they performed a series of concerts in 2014.

A.B. Quintanilla signed with DEL Records and formed Elektro Kumbia in 2016. In 2017, he released a single called "Piña Colada Shot".

In media 
In the 1997 film Selena, Quintanilla was played by Jacob Vargas, while Rafael Tamayo played him as a child. In the 2020 Netflix TV series Selena: The Series, he was played by Gabriel Chavarria, while Juan Martinez played him as a child.

Personal life 
Quintanilla has eight children, including a son Svani (b. 1991) and a daughter Martika (b. 1989) with his first wife Vangie. Quintanilla also has five other sons and one daughter born between 2002 and 2007. He also has one grandchild.

He married his longtime girlfriend Rikkie Leigh Robertson on November 12, 2011. On July 5, 2016, he announced after a concert that he was getting divorced from his wife. They have no children together.

Quintanilla married Anjelah O., an Argentinian woman, on September 16, 2019, in Las Vegas.

Discography 

Albums with Selena
 Mis Primeras Grabaciones (1984)
 Alpha (1986)
 Muñequito de Trapo (1987)
 And the Winner Is... (1987)
 Preciosa (1988)
 Dulce Amor (1988)
 Selena (1989)
 Ven Conmigo (1990)
 Entre a Mi Mundo (1992)
 Selena Live! (1993)
 Amor Prohibido (1994)
 Dreaming of You (1995)

Albums with Kumbia Kings
 Amor, Familia y Respeto (1999)
 Shhh! (2001)
 All Mixed Up: Los Remixes (2002)
 4 (2003)
 Presents Kumbia Kings (2003)
 La Historia (2003)
 Los Remixes 2.0 (2004)
 Fuego (2004)
 Duetos (2005)
 Kumbia Kings Live (2006)
 Greatest Hits (2007)
 Lo Mejor De (2016)

Albums with Kumbia All Starz
 Ayer Fue Kumbia Kings, Hoy Es Kumbia All Starz (2006)
 Planeta Kumbia (2008)
 La Vida de un Genio (2010)
 Blanco y Negro (2013)
 Éxitos en Vivo (2014)
 Elektro Kumbia (2017)

Awards and nominations

See also 

 Selena
 Los Dinos
 Kumbia Kings
 Kumbia All Starz
 Elektro Kumbia
 Honorific nicknames in popular music
 Music of Texas
 Music of Latin America

References

External links 
  Archived from the original on May 17, 2014.
 
 A.B. Quintanilla at Allmusic

 
1963 births
20th-century American guitarists
21st-century American guitarists
American bass guitarists
American child musicians
American expatriates in Mexico
American male bass guitarists
American male guitarists
American musicians of Mexican descent
Capitol Latin artists
Cumbia musicians
EMI Latin artists
Guitarists from Texas
Guitarists from Washington (state)
Hispanic and Latino American musicians
Kumbia All Starz members
Kumbia Kings members
Latin Grammy Award winners
Latin music record producers
Latin music songwriters
Lead guitarists
Living people
Mariachi musicians
People from Corpus Christi, Texas
People from Lake Jackson, Texas
People from Toppenish, Washington
Record producers from Texas
Selena y Los Dinos members
Songwriters from Texas
Tejano pop musicians
Universal Music Latin Entertainment artists